Mouloud is a town located in the southern Dikhil region of Djibouti. It is located around 102 kilometers south of the capital, Djibouti City.

Overview
It lies on the National Highway 1.

Nearby towns and villages include Djibouti City (102 km), Dadahalou (15 km), Ali Sabieh (30 km), Weʽa (64 km) and Dikhil (20 km).

Demographics
As of 2015, the population of Mouloud has been estimated to be 6,005. The town's inhabitants belong to various mainly Afro-Asiatic speaking ethnic groups, with the Issa Somali predominant.

Climate
The warmest month of the year is June with an average temperature of 35.7 °C. In January, the average temperature is 22.8 °C. It is the lowest average temperature of the whole year and the driest month is December with 2 mm. Most precipitation falls in August, with an average of 41 mm.

References
Mouloud, Djibouti

Populated places in Djibouti